Cláudio Aparecido Tencati (born 9 December 1973) is a Brazilian football manager, currently in charge of Criciúma.

Career
Born in Indianópolis, Paraná, Tencati started his career with Cianorte, being a fitness coach, assistant manager and manager of the youth setup between 1997 and 2005. Ahead of the 2006 season, after being an assistant and interim, he was named manager of the main squad.

Tencati was named in charge of Paranavaí for the 2009 campaign, but was sacked on 2 February of that year. He then moved to Iraty in 2010 to work as manager of the under-20 side.

On 21 April 2021, Tencati was named the new manager of Londrina. While at the club, he won the 2011 Campeonato Paranaense Série Prata, the 2014 Campeonato Paranaense, and achieved two consecutive promotions in the 2014 Série D and the 2015 Série C. Additionally, he also won the 2017 Primeira Liga.

In November 2017, Tencati left Londrina after six years in charge. He took over fellow Série B side Atlético Goianiense on 30 January of the following year, but was sacked on 13 October.

On 19 March 2019, Tencati replaced Marcelo Chamusca at the helm of Vitória, but was himself dismissed on 19 May. He returned to Londrina on 22 August, but was sacked on 28 September after only one win in eight matches.

On 1 November 2020, Tencati was appointed in charge of Brasil de Pelotas. Sacked on 29 July of the following year, he replaced Paulo Baier at the helm of Criciúma on 5 October.

Honours
Londrina
 Campeonato Paranaense Série B: 2011
 Campeonato Paranaense: 2014
 Primeira Liga: 2017

References

External links
 

1973 births
Living people
Sportspeople from Paraná (state)
Brazilian football managers
Campeonato Brasileiro Série B managers
Campeonato Brasileiro Série C managers
Cianorte Futebol Clube managers
Iraty Sport Club managers
Londrina Esporte Clube managers
Atlético Clube Goianiense managers
Esporte Clube Vitória managers
Grêmio Esportivo Brasil managers
Criciúma Esporte Clube managers